Carl William Reinhard (May 17, 1922 – January 30, 2016) was an American football player. He played professionally in the All-America Football Conference (AAFC) for the Los Angeles Dons. Born in Los Angeles, California, Reinhard played college football at the University of California, Berkeley and was drafted in the 23rd round of the 1944 NFL Draft by the Washington Redskins. His brother Bob Reinhard also played in the AAFC. Reinhard died in January 2016 at the age of 93.

References

1922 births
2016 deaths
American football defensive backs
American football running backs
California Golden Bears football players
Los Angeles Dons players
Sportspeople from Glendale, California
Players of American football from Los Angeles